B'nai Israel Traditional Synagogue is a Jewish synagogue located in Alexandria, Louisiana.  It was founded in 1913 as an Orthodox synagogue by Jews from Poland and Russia, many of whom arrived in Alexandria and Central Louisiana as part of the Galveston Movement.  In the 1950s the congregation became Conservative.

History

The first shul was located at Fourth and Lee Streets.  Ten years after B'nai Israel's founding, the congregation had twenty members.  A full-time rabbi, Rabbi Jacob Aronson, led Shabbat services and a cheder, which met three times per week. The religious school soon thereafter met six days per week that "provided instruction in Hebrew language, history, and the Bible." By 1940, the congregation had its own building and a small cemetery just north of the city.

In the 1950s a new concrete block building was constructed on Vance Avenue.  The rectangular structure was designed with Mid-Century modern architecture.

Today

Today "The Shul" meets weekly for Friday evening Shabbat services.

See also

Congregation Gemiluth Chassodim
Alexandria, Louisiana

References

Conservative synagogues in the United States
Synagogues in Louisiana
Jewish organizations established in 1913
Synagogues completed in 1954
Buildings and structures in Alexandria, Louisiana
Polish-American history
Russian-American history
1913 establishments in Louisiana